Brookline may refer to:

Places in the United States 

 Brookline, Massachusetts, a town near Boston
 Brookline, Missouri
 Brookline, New Hampshire
 Brookline (Pittsburgh), a neighborhood in Pittsburgh, Pennsylvania
 Brookline, Vermont

See also
 Brooklin, Maine
 Brooklyn